38 Boötis is a single star in the northern constellation of Boötes, located approximately 157 light years from the Sun. It has the traditional name Merga  and the Bayer designation h Boötis; 38 Boötis is the star's Flamsteed designation. This object is visible to the naked eye as a dim, yellow-white hued star with an apparent visual magnitude of 5.76. It is moving closer to the Earth with a heliocentric radial velocity of −4.5 km/s.

This is a sharp-lined ('s') subgiant star with a stellar classification of F6 IVs, which indicates it has consumed the hydrogen at its core and is evolving off the main sequence. It is about 1.7 billion years old and is spinning with a relatively low projected rotational velocity of 10 km/s, as indicated by the sharp lines. The star has 1.6 times the mass of the Sun and 2.5 times the Sun's radius. It is radiating 9.5 times the luminosity of the Sun from its photosphere at an effective temperature of 6,591 K.

Nomenclature
It has the traditional name Merga, occasionally spelled Marrha or in full El Mara el Musalsela, from the Arabic المرأة المسلسلة al-mar’ah al-musalsalah "the chained woman". Another occasional name was Falx Italica, from the Latin falx ītalica "billhook". In 2016, the International Astronomical Union organized a Working Group on Star Names (WGSN) to catalogue and standardize proper names for stars. The WGSN approved the name Merga for this star on 12 September 2016 and it is now so included in the List of IAU-approved Star Names.

References

External links
 HR 5533
 Image 38 Boötis

F-type subgiants
Boötes
Bootis, h
BD+46 1993
Bootis, 38
130945
072487
5533
Merga